Vonášek, female Vonášková is a Czech surname. Notable people with the surname include:

 Roman Vonášek (born 1968), Czech footballer
 Václav Vonášek (born 1980), Czech bassoonist

Czech-language surnames